Daljeet Singh (born 14 October 1995) is a cricketer who plays for the Hong Kong national cricket team. Daljeet is a right-handed batsman and bowls right-arm medium.

Daljeet made his Twenty20 cricket debut against Nepal national cricket team on 13 March 2012. He played a total of four T20 games.

References

External links

1995 births
Living people
Hong Kong cricketers
Cricketers at the 2014 Asian Games
Hong Kong people of Indian descent
Asian Games competitors for Hong Kong